Exit Sunset Boulevard is a 1980 German drama film written and directed by Bastian Clevé and starring Rüdiger Kuhlbrodt and Azizi Johari, and as guest Elke Sommer. The film takes its name from Sunset Boulevard.

Plot
A German man (Rüdiger Kuhlbrodt) travels to California to claim an inheritance, but discovers it is tied up in property in the desert. He tries to set himself up there, but he soon finds himself overwhelmed by the American way of life and begins to suffer a mental breakdown.

References

External links
 

1980 films
1980 drama films
German drama films
West German films
English-language German films
Films set in California
1980s German films